The Cozumel vireo (Vireo bairdi) is a species of bird in the family Vireonidae.
It is endemic to the Mexican island of Cozumel off the Yucatán Peninsula.
Its natural habitats are subtropical or tropical dry forests and heavily degraded former forest.

References

External links
Cozumel Vireo videos on the Internet Bird Collection
Cozumel Vireo photo; Article Highlights of Cozumel's Avifauna

Vireo (genus)
Birds of the Yucatán Peninsula
Birds of Mexico
Endemic birds of Southern Mexico
Birds described in 1885
Endemic fauna of Cozumel
Endemic birds of the Caribbean
Taxa named by Robert Ridgway
Taxonomy articles created by Polbot